Eaton High School is a public high school in Eaton, Ohio, U.S.  It is the only high school in the Eaton Community School district. The district lies entirely within Preble County and serves students within the City of Eaton along with portions of Washington, Gasper, Dixon, and Israel Townships. The High School is located at 600 Hillcrest Drive, Eaton, OH 45320.

Athletics
The Eaton Eagles wear purple, gold, and white  and participate as members of the Southwestern Buckeye League. The Eagles have captured over 100 league titles during their 75 year span in the SWBL. Eaton's primary league rivals are Brookville High School and Valley View High School.

Ohio High School Athletic Association State Championships

 Boys Basketball – 1948 
 Boys Cross Country – 2001 
 Girls Tennis - 2021

References

External links
 District Website

High schools in Preble County, Ohio
Public high schools in Ohio
High School